Christopher Dennis Rath is an Australian politician.

He was appointed to the New South Wales Legislative Council on 24 March 2022 to fill the casual vacancy caused by the resignation of Don Harwin. He is a member of the Liberal Party.

He is one of the two openly LGBTI Liberal Party members of the Legislative Council, .

Background
Rath graduated from the University of Sydney with a Bachelor of Economics University and Master of Management. Between 2015 and 2022, he was a Government Relations Manager for Insurance Australia Group (IAG).

Political career
Rath joined the Young Liberals in 2006 in Wollongong. Since then, he had served in a number of roles in the state branch of the Liberal Party, including as a member of the state executive 2015 to 2022 and as the Urban Vice-President from 2019 to 2022.

References

Living people
LGBT conservatism
Members of the New South Wales Legislative Council
Liberal Party of Australia members of the Parliament of New South Wales
21st-century Australian politicians
Year of birth missing (living people)